A referendum on land laws was held in Denmark on 25 June 1963. The four land laws, which had already been passed by the Danish parliament, were rejected by voters. This is the only time in Danish history that a law passed by parliament was sent to a public referendum by a minority in parliament.

Background

On May 31, 1963, Prime Minister Jens Otto Krag's two parties in government (the Social Democrats and the Social Liberal Party), along with the Socialist People's Party, passed ten land laws in parliament. The remaining parties (the Liberals, the Conservative People's Party, and the Independent Party) voted against the laws.

On the same day, 71 of 179 members of parliament (i.e. every member of the Liberals and the Conservative People's Party) handed in a signed decree that a public referendum must be held about four of these laws. In doing so, they invoked chapter 42, section 1 in the Danish constitution which states that a law that has been passed can be sent to a public referendum if one third of parliament signs a decree. This chapter and section of the constitution had never been used before.

The disputed land laws

Obligatory residence
The first of the four laws sent to public referendum concerned the obligatory residence of agricultural estates in rural areas. According to the law, anyone acquiring an agricultural estate was required to take residence at the estate within six months of the acquisition. Acquisition of more than one such estate was to require permission from the Minister for Agriculture.

State's first option to buy
This law stated that, when a land owner sold a property in a rural area of 1 hectare (10,000 m2) or more, the state would have the first option to buy said property. The purpose of the law was to give the state the opportunity to acquire land for use in agriculture, gardening, recreational areas, or public purposes.

Town's first option to buy
Unlike the first two laws, this law centered on properties outside of rural areas, i.e. in towns and the outskirts of towns. The contents and intent of the law were much like those of the laws regarding the state's first option to buy, except that the purchaser would be the municipalities and that the law affected properties of 6,000 m2 or more.

Preservation of natural amenities
The fourth law was to make it possible to list areas for protection on basis of their natural beauty, their location, or their peculiarity.

Results

Obligatory residence

State's first option to buy

Town's first option to buy

Preservation of natural amenities

Aftermath
As a result of the four laws being rejected, the remaining six laws were withdrawn as well.

Notes

Referendums in Denmark
Danish land laws referendum
Land laws referendum
Danish land laws referendum
Danish land laws referendum